Stanton by Dale is a civil parish in the Borough of Erewash in Derbyshire, England.  The parish contains ten listed buildings that are recorded in the National Heritage List for England.  Of these, one is listed at Grade II*, the middle of the three grades, and the others are at Grade II, the lowest grade.  The parish contains the village of Stanton by Dale and the surrounding area, and the listed buildings consist of a country house, a farmhouse, smaller houses and cottages, a row of almshouses, a church with a war memorial in the churchyard, a village cross and a village pump.


Key

Buildings

References

Citations

Sources

 

Lists of listed buildings in Derbyshire